Comandante Fernández Department is a central department of Chaco Province in Argentina.

The provincial subdivision has a population of about 88,000 inhabitants in an area of  1,500 km², and its capital city is Presidencia Roque Sáenz Peña, which is located around 1,120 km from the Capital federal.

References

External links
Travel guide (Spanish)
Municipal Website (Spanish)

Departments of Chaco Province